Tenth Avenue Kid is a 1938 American crime film directed by Bernard Vorhaus and written by Gordon Kahn and Adele Buffington. The film stars Bruce Cabot, Beverly Roberts, Ben Welden, Horace McMahon, John Wray and Jay Novello. The film was released on August 22, 1938, by Republic Pictures.

Plot
Jim Loomis is a reporter after a big story about a heist, the kid Tommy Turner knows the identity of the gang, but Loomis has a hard time getting him to spill the beans.

Cast 
Bruce Cabot as Jim 'Silk' Loomis
Beverly Roberts as Susan Holland
Ben Welden as Marty Dayton
Horace McMahon as Max Hooker
John Wray as Joe Turner 
Jay Novello as Hobart
Charles C. Wilson as Commissioner
Byron Foulger as Dr. Belknap
Paul Bryar as Wheeler
Walter Sande as Detective Faber
Ralph Dunn as Detective Egan
Julian Petruzzi as Jerry Simons
Tommy Ryan as Tommy Turner

References

External links
 

1938 films
American crime films
1938 crime films
Republic Pictures films
Films directed by Bernard Vorhaus
American black-and-white films
1930s English-language films
1930s American films